Kavsi (also Romanized as Kavsī) is a village in Nazluchay Rural District, Nazlu District, Urmia County, West Azerbaijan Province, Iran. At the 2006 census, its population was 748, in 123 families.

References 

Populated places in Urmia County